Yolyn Am (Lammergeier Valley) is a deep and narrow gorge in the Gurvan Saikhan Mountains of southern Mongolia.  The valley is named after the Lammergeier, which is called Yol in Mongolian.  The Lammergeier is an Old World vulture, hence the name is often translated to Valley of the Vultures or Valley of the Eagles.

The valley is located within Gobi Gurvansaikhan National Park.

Yolyn Am is found in the Zuun Saikhanii Nuruu (the Eastern Beauty) subrange of the Gurvan Saikhan Mountains.  The area, as part of the Gobi Desert, sees little precipitation.  However, Yolyn Am is notable for a deep ice field.  The ice field reaches several meters thick by the end of winter, and is several kilometers long.  In past years it remained year round, but the modern ice field tends to disappear by September.

External links 

Canyons and gorges of Mongolia